Michael Conaghan (born 4 September 1944) is a former Irish Labour Party politician who served as a Teachta Dála (TD) for the Dublin South-Central constituency from 2011 to 2016. He also served as Lord Mayor of Dublin from 2004 to 2005.

Biography 
Conaghan is originally from County Donegal. He lives in Ballyfermot, Dublin and is married with two children. He is a teacher by profession, and was vice-principal of Inchicore College of Further Education.

Originally a member of Jim Kemmy's Democratic Socialist Party, he contested a number of elections for them in the 1980s. When that party merged with Labour in 1991, he was elected to Dublin City Council representing the Ballyfermot local electoral area. He was Lord Mayor of Dublin from 2004 to 2005.

He did not contest the 2016 general election.

References

1944 births
Living people
Alumni of University College Dublin
Democratic Socialist Party (Ireland) politicians
Irish schoolteachers
Labour Party (Ireland) TDs
Lord Mayors of Dublin
Members of the 31st Dáil
Politicians from County Donegal